Stéphanie is a feminine French feminine given name. Notable people with the name include:

Stéphanie, Hereditary Grand Duchess of Luxembourg (born 1984), Belgian noble; wife of Guillaume, Hereditary Grand Duke of Luxembourg
Princess Stéphanie (disambiguation), several people
Stéphanie Arricau (born 1973), French golfer
Stéphanie Atger (born 1975), French politician
Stéphanie Blake (born 1968), author of children's stories
Stéphanie Bouvier (born 1981), short track speed-skater
Stéphanie de Beauharnais (1789–1860), consort of Karl, Grand Duke of Baden
Stéphanie Cohen-Aloro (born 1983), French tennis player
Stéphanie Dixon (born 1984), Canadian swimmer
Stéphanie Dubois (born 1986), Canadian tennis player
Stéphanie Falzon (born 1983), French hammer thrower
Stéphanie Félicité du Crest de Saint-Aubin (1746–1830), French writer and educator
Stéphanie Foretz (born 1981), French tennis player
Stéphanie Jiménez (born 1974), Andorran mountain runner
Stéphanie Lapointe (born 1984), Canadian singer, songwriter, and actress
Stéphanie Mbanzendore, Burundian feminist activist
Stéphanie Moisdon (born 1967), French curator and art critic
Stéphanie Amélie Mismaque (1881–1958), commonly known as Fanny Rozet, French artist
Stéphanie Possamaï (born 1980), French judoka
Stéphanie St-Pierre (born 1985), Canadian freestyle skier
Stéphanie Vallée, Canadian politician, lawyer and negotiator
Stéphanie Vongsouthi (born 1988), French tennis player

See also
Stephanie

French feminine given names